Alvin Atlas Montgomery (July 3, 1920 – April 26, 1942) was a catcher in Major League Baseball. He played for the Boston Braves in 1941.

He appeared in the movie The Pride of the Yankees as an uncredited extra, playing various catchers.

Montgomery died in an automobile accident in Waverly, Virginia on April 26, 1942.

See also
 List of baseball players who died during their careers

References

External links

1920 births
1942 deaths
People from Eddy County, New Mexico
Road incident deaths in Virginia
Major League Baseball catchers
Baseball players from New Mexico
Bisbee Bees players
Boston Braves players
Moline Plow Boys players
Monett Red Birds
Ponca City Angels players
Tulsa Oilers (baseball) players
Los Angeles High School alumni